The End Machine is the first album by American supergroup The End Machine. It was released on March 22, 2019, and produced by bass player Jeff Pilson for Italian music label Frontiers Records. It was preceded by the single "Alive Today" on January 11, 2019. According to a 2021 interview with guitarist George Lynch, the band is an intentional return to the classic Dokken sound. 

The band played three live shows to promote the album.

Track listing
All songs written by George Lynch, Jeff Pilson and Robert Mason.

Personnel

George Lynch - electric guitar, acoustic Guitar, sounds
Jeff Pilson - bass, 10-String Bass, fretless bass, keyboards, acoustic guitar, backing vocals, producing, recording
Mick Brown - drums, percussion, backing vocals
Robert Mason - lead and backing vocals

Additional personnel
Alessandro Del Vecchio - mixing, mastering at Ivotytears Music Works Studios, Somma Lombardo, Italy
Maor Appelbaum - remastering at Maor Appelbaum Mastering, Los Angeles, CA United States
G.H. Mason - Art & Design

References

2019 debut albums